Dichmann, Wright & Pugh, Inc. was shipping company founded in Norfolk, Virginia in 1925 by Vilh Dichmann, Bland Saunders Wright, Frank C. Pugh, Clint B. Sellers, and Alan Smith.  Pugh had operated a company office in Philadelphia. Clint B. Sellers operated a company office in New York City. Saunders Wright was Dichmann, Wright & Pugh, Inc. President. Alan Smith was the company  
secretary and treasurer. Bland Saunders Wright worked in the Dichmann, Wright & Pugh, Inc. headquarters in Norfolk until his death on October 16, 1944. After Wright death, Alan Smith became president of Dichmann, Wright & Pugh, Inc and John M. Levick became assistant secretary and treasurer. With the start of World War II Dichmann, Wright & Pugh, Inc. supported the war effort.

World War II
Dichmann, Wright & Pugh, Inc. fleet of ships were used to help the World War II effort. During World War II Dichmann, Wright & Pugh, Inc. operated Merchant navy ships for the United States Shipping Board. During World War II Dichmann, Wright & Pugh, Inc. was active with charter shipping with the Maritime Commission and War Shipping Administration. Dichmann, Wright & Pugh, Inc. operated Liberty ships and Victory ships for the merchant navy. The ship was run by its Dichmann, Wright & Pugh, Inc. crew and the US Navy supplied United States Navy Armed Guards to man the deck guns and radio.

Ships
Ships owned:
USS Bullock (AK-165) purchased in 1947

World War II operated:
Liberty Ships:
SS Matthew Lyon 
 Barbara Frietchie  
 Paul Dunbar  
 Rushville Victory, troop ship  
 Lloyd S. Carlson  
 Luther S. Kelly  
 George Sharswood  
 Sidney Wright  
 Matthew Lyon  
 David Wilmot, post war work in 1946  
 William H. Kendrick, post war work in 1947  
 William H. Wilmer  
 Thomas Say post war work in 1947  
 Niels Poulson,  on Sept. 14, 1946 hit mined off Gorgona, Italy, towed to Leghorn but was total lose.  
 Ezra Meech  
 Arlie Clark  
 Henry M. Robert  
 Frederick H. Baetjer  
 SS John McKinley  
 James Moore, troop ship  

Victory ship operated:
SS Rushville Victory

C1 Cargo ship
MS Sea Witch
USS Antrim (AK-159)

See also

World War II United States Merchant Navy

References 

Defunct shipping companies of the United States
American companies established in 1925